The fox sparrow (Passerella iliaca) is a large New World sparrow. It is the only member of the genus Passerella, although some authors split the species into four (see below).

Taxonomy

More specific information regarding plumage is available in the accounts for the various taxa.
Red fox sparrow, P. i. iliaca (Merrem, 1786) – this taxon breeds in the taiga of Canada and Alaska and winters in central and eastern North America. This is the brightest colored group.
Sooty fox sparrow, P. i. unalaschcensis (Gmelin, JF, 1789) – this taxon breeds along the Pacific coast of North America from the Aleutian Islands south to northwestern Washington, and winters from southeastern Alaska south to northern Baja California. It is browner and darker than the red fox sparrow.
Slate-colored fox sparrow, P. i. schistacea Baird, SF, 1858 – this taxon breeds in interior western North America and winters to the south and west. It has a gray head and mantle, brown wings, brown breast streaks, and a russet tail.
Thick-billed fox sparrow, P. i. megarhyncha Baird, SF, 1858 – this taxon is mostly restricted to California and Oregon. This group is similar in coloration to the slate-colored fox sparrow, but features a particularly thick bill, as its name suggests.

Description

Adults are among the largest sparrows, heavily spotted and streaked underneath. All feature a messy central breast spot though it is less noticeable on the thick billed and slate-colored varieties. Plumage varies markedly from one group to another.

Measurements:

 Length: 5.9-7.5 in (15-19 cm)
 Weight: 0.9-1.6 oz (26-44 g)
 Wingspan: 10.5-11.4 in (26.7-29 cm)

Behavior
These birds forage by scratching the ground, which makes them vulnerable to cats and other predators, though they are generally common. Fox sparrows migrate on the west coast of the United States.

Diet
They mainly eat seeds and insects, as well as some berries. Coastal fox sparrows may also eat crustaceans.

Reproduction
Fox sparrows nest in wooded areas across northern Canada and western North America from Alaska to California. They nest either in a sheltered location on the ground or low in trees or shrubs. A nest typically contains two to five pale green to greenish white eggs speckled with reddish brown.

Systematics

The review by Zink & Weckstein (2003), which added mtDNA cytochrome b, NADH dehydrogenase subunit 2 and 3, and D-loop sequence, confirmed the four "subspecies groups" of the fox sparrow that were outlined by the initial limited mtDNA haplotype comparison (Zink 1994). These should probably be recognized as separate species, but this was deferred for further analysis of hybridization. Particularly the contact zones between the slate-colored and thick-billed fox sparrows which are only weakly distinct morphologically were of interest; the other groups were found to be distinct far earlier. A further study of the nuclear genome, using microsatellites, showed similar separation between the four groups.

The combined molecular data is unable to resolve the interrelationship of the subspecies groups and of the subspecies in these, but aids in confirming the distinctness of the thick-billed group. Biogeography indicates that the coastal populations were probably isolated during an epoch of glaciation of the Rocky Mountains range, but this is also not very helpful in resolving the remaining problems of within-group diversity, and inter-group relationships.

Major taxonomic authorities currently differ in their treatment of the fox sparrow complex. The IOC World Bird List/Birds of the World: Recommended English Names and the HBW and BirdLife International Illustrated Checklist of the Birds of the World treat each of the four subspecies groups as a separate species, while eBird/The Clements Checklist of Birds of the World and The Howard and Moore Complete Checklist of the Birds of the World currently treat the complex as a single species.

References

Further reading

Book
 Weckstein, J. D., D. E. Kroodsma, and R. C. Faucett. (2002). Fox Sparrow (Passerella iliaca). The Birds of North America Online (A. Poole, Ed.). Ithaca: Cornell Laboratory of Ornithology; Retrieved from The Birds of North American Online database

Theses
 Blacquiere JR. M.Sc. (1980). Some aspects of the breeding biology and vocalizations of the fox sparrow, Passerella iliaca, Merrem, in Newfoundland. Memorial University of Newfoundland (Canada), Canada.
 Kessen AE. Ph.D. (2004). Population structure in the fox sparrow: An investigation using microsatellites. University of Minnesota, United States—Minnesota.
 Martin DJ. Ph.D. (1976). STRUCTURE OF SONGS AND ORGANIZATION OF SINGING IN FOX SPARROWS BREEDING IN NORTHERN UTAH AND SOUTHERN IDAHO. Utah State University, United States—Utah.
 Zink RM. Ph.D. (1983). PATTERNS AND EVOLUTIONARY SIGNIFICANCE OF GEOGRAPHIC VARIATION IN THE SCHISTACEA GROUP OF THE FOX SPARROW (PASSERELLA ILIACA) (OREGON, NEVADA, CALIFORNIA). University of California, Berkeley, United States—California.

Articles
 
 
 
 Blankson ENT & McKernan RL. (1995). Evolutionary and ecological considerations of seven subspecies of the fox sparrow (Passerella iliaca) wintering in California. Strauss, M. vol S, p. Unity in Diversity.

External links

 Fox sparrow - Passerella iliaca - USGS Patuxent Bird Identification InfoCenter
 Fox sparrow species account - Cornell Lab of Ornithology
 
 

fox sparrow
fox sparrow
Native birds of Alaska
Birds of Canada
Native birds of the Northwestern United States
Native birds of the Western United States
fox sparrow
fox sparrow